"Bang Bang (My Baby Shot Me Down)" is the second single by American singer-actress Cher from her second album, The Sonny Side of Chér.  It was written by her husband Sonny Bono and released in 1966. The song reached No. 3 in the UK Singles Chart and No. 2 on the Billboard Hot 100 for a week (behind "(You're My) Soul and Inspiration" by The Righteous Brothers), eventually becoming one of Cher's biggest-selling singles of the 1960s.

History
The single proved successful, charting high in several countries. It became Cher's first million-selling single and her first top 3 hit in the UK (and her last until "The Shoop Shoop Song (It's in His Kiss)" reached No. 1 in 1991).
Critic Tim Sendra, in his album review of The Sonny Side of Cher, gave the song a mixed review: "The only track that has any real zest is the Bono-written novelty 'Bang Bang (My Baby Shot Me Down)', the kind of dramatic song Cher could knock out in her sleep but also a song with no real heart." The reviewer for Cashbox said the song was "inventive" and predicted it would become a "blockbuster" hit. The reviewer praised its "plaintive, blues-soaked" style, as well as the "interesting Gypsy-ish backing".

In 1987, Cher recorded a rock version of the song for her 1987 Platinum-certified comeback album Cher. Produced by Jon Bon Jovi, Richie Sambora and Desmond Child, the song featured backing vocals by Jon Bon Jovi and Michael Bolton, among others and was released as a promotional single in 1988. Cher performed this version on her Heart of Stone Tour and on Living Proof: The Farewell Tour and it was played instrumentally on the Dressed to Kill Tour in 2014, Classic Cher in 2017–2020 and the Here We Go Again Tour in 2018–2020.

Track listing
 1966 US and European 7" single
 "Bang Bang (My Baby Shot Me Down)" – 2:40
 "Our Day Will Come" – 2:28
 1987 French 7" single
 "Bang-Bang" – 3:51
 "I Found Someone" – 3:42
 1993 French CD single
 "Bang-Bang" – 3:54
 "Whenever You're Near" – 4:05

Charts

Weekly charts

Year-end charts

Other versions
Nancy Sinatra recorded one of the best-known covers of the song, for her 1966 album How Does That Grab You? Featuring tremolo guitar played by her arranger, Billy Strange, Sinatra's version had a resurgence in popularity when it was used in the opening credits of the 2003 Quentin Tarantino film Kill Bill Volume 1. In the sequence preceding the opening credits, Tarantino creates a literal, bloody interpretation of the song's chorus and the third verse, about a wedding day.

Vanilla Fudge, an American band known predominantly for their slow extended heavy rock arrangements of contemporary hit songs, included the song in their eponymous album released in 1967.

The song was also popular in Italy in 1966, when it was covered in Italian by Dalida, reaching number one and charting for two months, winning her a gold record. It appeared on her 1967 album, Piccolo Ragazzo.

In the 2008 French drama Maman est chez le coiffeur one of the abandoned boys sings and performs his version of the song.

Lady Gaga performed "Bang Bang (My Baby Shot Me Down)" in July 2014 at Jazz at Lincoln Center, for the TV special Cheek to Cheek Live!. The live recording was made available as an iTunes/Apple Music bonus track with her collaborative album with Tony Bennett, Cheek to Cheek. Gaga's rendition of "Bang Bang" debuted at No. 1 on Billboard's Jazz Digital Songs Chart and was well-received by critics. The singer would later include the song in her tours and residency shows.

Caroline Polachek recorded a funky, upbeat cover of "Bang Bang" for the soundtrack of the 2022 film Minions: The Rise of Gru, which also features a version in Chinese by G.E.M., and several other modern covers of older songs.

References

External links
 "Bang Bang (My Baby Shot Me Down)" Sheet music for Billy Strange's tremolo guitar part
 
 

1966 singles
1966 songs
1988 singles
American folk rock songs
Cher songs
Imperial Records singles
Nancy Sinatra songs
Petula Clark songs
Songs written by Sonny Bono
Anita Lindblom songs
Lady Gaga songs